The Bedingfeld, later Paston-Bedingfeld Baronetcy, of Oxburgh in the County of Norfolk, is a title in the Baronetage of England. It was created on 2 January 1660 for Henry Bedingfeld, a cavalier, in recompense for his losses in the Royalist cause during the Civil War, when he fought as a captain in Charles I's armies, and Interregnum years, computed at £47,194 18s 8d,. The Bedingfelds are said to descend from 'Ogerlis', a Norman, who, in 1100, held land at Bedingfield, Suffolk. His descendant, Edmund Bedingfeld, married Margaret (died 1446), daughter and heiress of Sir Robert Tuddenham (and sister and co-heir of her brother Sir Thomas Tuddenham, executed in 1462), bringing to her husband estates including the manor of Oxburgh, near Swaffham, Norfolk.

The sixth Baronet married Margaret Anne, daughter and heiress of Edward Paston. In 1830 he assumed by Royal licence the additional surname of Paston. The eighth Baronet was a Major in the 3rd Battalion of the Liverpool Regiment, and served in the Second Boer War. The present Baronet is a co-heir to the ancient barony of Grandison, which has been in abeyance since 1375. Henry Paston-Bedingfeld, the noted officer of arms, is the 10th baronet.

The family seat is Oxburgh Hall, King's Lynn, Norfolk, now owned by the National Trust.

Bedingfeld, later Paston-Bedingfeld baronets, of Oxburgh (1660)

Sir Henry Bedingfeld, 1st Baronet (1614–1685)
Sir Henry Bedingfeld, 2nd Baronet (1636–1704)
Sir Henry Bedingfeld, 3rd Baronet (died 1760)
Sir Richard Henry Bedingfeld, 4th Baronet (1720–1795)
Sir Richard Bedingfeld, 5th Baronet (1767–1829)
Sir Henry Richard Paston-Bedingfeld, 6th Baronet (1800–1862)
Sir Henry George Paston-Bedingfeld, 7th Baronet (1830–1902)
Sir Henry Edward Paston-Bedingfeld, 8th Baronet (1860–1941)
Sir Edmund George Felix Paston-Bedingfeld, 9th Baronet (1915–2011)
Sir Henry Edgar Paston-Bedingfeld, 10th Baronet (born 1943)

Notes

References

Bibliography

External links 
 
 http://www.thepeerage.com/

Paston-Bedingfeld
1660 establishments in England
Recusants